The Rural Municipality of Chester No. 125 is a rural municipality (RM) in the Canadian province of Saskatchewan within Census Division No. 5 and  Division No. 1. It is located in the southeast portion of the province.

History 
The RM of Chester No. 125 incorporated as a rural municipality on December 13, 1909.

Heritage properties
There is one designated heritage building located within the rural municipality:
Clemence Schmitz Residence - The residence was constructed by Peter Schmitz who homesteaded in the area north west of Windthorst. in 1903.  The residence include a small chapel.  The building is currently being converted into a museum.

Geography

Communities and localities 
The following urban municipalities are surrounded by the RM.

Villages
Glenavon

The following unincorporated communities are within the RM.

Organized hamlets
Peebles

Localities
Baring
Peebles
Windthorst

Demographics 

Government 
The RM of Chester No. 125 is governed by an elected municipal council and an appointed administrator that meets on the first Wednesday of every month. The reeve of the RM is Merril Wozniak while its administrator is James Hoff. The RM's office is located in Glenavon.

References 

C

Division No. 5, Saskatchewan